Desymmetrization in stereochemistry is the modification of a molecule that results in the loss of one or more symmetry elements.  A common application of this class of reactions involves the introduction of chirality.  Formally, such conversions required the loss of an improper axis of rotation (mirror plane, center of inversion, rotation-reflection axis). In other words, desymmetrisations convert prochiral precursors into chiral products.

Examples
Typical substrates are epoxides, diols, dienes, and carboxylic acid anhydrides.

One example is the conversion of cis-3,5-diacetoxycyclopentene to monoacetate. In this transformation, the plane of symmetry in the precursor is lost, and the product is asymmetric.  The desymmetrisation itself is not usually considered useful.  The enantioselective desymmetrisation however delivers a useful product.  This particular conversion utilizes the enzyme cholinesterase.

In another example, a symmetrical cyclic imide is subjected to asymmetric deprotonation resulting in a chiral product with high enantioselectivity.

Transfer hydrogenation converts benzil (PhC(O)C(O)Ph) into one enantiomer of hydrobenzoin:
PhC(O)C(O)Ph  +  2 H2   →   PhCH(OH)CH(OH)Ph
The precursor benzil has C2v symmetry, and the product is C2 symmetric.

Citric acid is also a symmetric molecule that can be desymmetrized by partial methylation.

References

Stereochemistry